The Laureus World Sports Awards  is an annual award ceremony honouring individuals and teams from the world of sports along with sporting achievements throughout the year. It was established in 1999 by Laureus Sport for Good Foundation founding patrons Daimler and Richemont. It is supported by its global partners Mercedes-Benz, IWC Schaffhausen and Mitsubishi UFJ Financial Group.  The awards support the work of Laureus Sport for Good, which supports over 160 community projects in more than 40 countries. These programmes aim to use the power of sport to end violence, discrimination and disadvantage, and prove that sport has the power to change the world.  The name "Laureus" is derived from the Greek word for laurel, considered a traditional symbol of victory in athletics.

The first ceremony was held on 25 May 2000 in Monte Carlo, at which South African president Nelson Mandela gave the keynote speech.  , awards are made annually in eight categories, with a number of discretionary categories irregularly recognised.  The recipient of each award is presented with a Laureus statuette, created by Cartier, at an annual ceremony held in various locations around the world. , the ceremonies have been held in eleven different cities, and are broadcast in at least 160 countries.

Swiss tennis player Roger Federer holds the record for the most awards with six, five for Sportsman of the Year and one for Comeback of the Year. Serena Williams holds the record for most awards held by a female with five, four for Sportswoman of the Year and one for Comeback of the Year. A number of awards have been rescinded, namely those presented to American cyclist Lance Armstrong, American sprinter Marion Jones and Canadian amputee sprinter Earle Connor, each of whom were subsequently found to have illegally used drugs to achieve their records. In the 2020 ceremony, Argentine Lionel Messi became the first footballer to win the Laureus World Sportsman of the Year award. He is also the first athlete to win it coming from a team sport.

History
 
The World Sports Awards was conceived by former Austrian Olympic ski jumper Hubert Neuper, who "hatched the idea as a way to celebrate the top sportsmen of the 20th century". Initially named World Sports Awards of the Century and backed by the Austrian government, Neuper conducted a nominating conference in the month of June, 1999 with around 20 representatives of the media from around the world; followed by an award ceremony gala event in November. Shortly thereafter it was decided to make this an annual event and Neuper searched for corporate sponsorship, leading to Laureus taking over the project. South African businessman Johann Rupert, chairman of Richemont, proposed that an organisation be created "based on the principle that sport can bridge the gaps in society and change the way people look at the world."  The organisation, established in 1998 to do charity by a partnership of Richemont and Daimler became known as "Laureus", its name being derived from the Greek word for laurel, considered a traditional symbol of victory in athletics.  The first Laureus World Sports Awards ceremony was held two years later, at which the patron and president of South Africa, Nelson Mandela, delivered a speech which Edwin Moses has described as "iconic".

Awards were made in seven regular categories and two discretionary categories at the inaugural ceremony, hosted by the American actors Jeff Bridges and Dylan McDermott.  Two of those awards would later be rescinded: both the American cyclist Lance Armstrong and the American track athlete Marion Jones were found to have used performance-enhancing drugs and had their awards withdrawn.  The award for American amputee sprinter Earle Connor, who won the 2004 Laureus World Sportsperson of the Year with a Disability Award, was also later rescinded.

The awards are frequently referred to as the sporting equivalent of an "Oscar" for movies.  The awards have been criticized, with comments that their criteria are not clear.

Categories
The Laureus Nominations Panel, composed of more than 1,000 members of sports media from more than 70 countries, vote to create a shortlist of nominations in six categories:
 Laureus World Sportsman of the Year
 Laureus World Sportswoman of the Year
 Laureus World Team of the Year
 Laureus World Comeback of the Year
 Laureus World Breakthrough of the Year
 Laureus Action Sportsperson of the Year

The nominees of the Laureus World Sportsperson of the Year with a Disability are chosen by the International Paralympic Committee.

The Laureus World Sports Academy is an association of 68 retired sportspeople who volunteer to support the work of the Laureus Sport for Good Foundation. They also vote each year to decide the winners of the Laureus World Sports Awards.  , the chairman of the Academy is Sean Fitzpatrick, former rugby player from New Zealand.  The members of the Academy vote by secret ballot to select the winners.

The public votes to select the winner for one category, the Laureus Best Sporting Moment of the Year.

The Academy also makes discretionary awards, including:
Lifetime Achievement Award 
Sport for Good Award
Spirit of Sport Award
Exceptional Achievement Award
Sporting Inspiration Award

Ceremony
The Laureus World Sports Awards ceremony is held annually at various venues in various locations around the world. The inaugural ceremony took place at the Sporting Club in Monaco on 25 May 2000. , the ceremonies have been held in eleven cities around the world, and are broadcast in at least 160 countries. Each Laureus World Sports Award winner receives a Cartier Laureus statuette which features a "representation of the striving human form".

Winners by category

Regular awards

Sportsman and Sportswoman of the Year

Team of the Year

Breakthrough of the Year

Prior to 2007, this award was called Newcomer of the Year.

Comeback of the Year

Sportsperson with a Disability of the Year

Action Sportsperson of the Year

Prior to 2007, this award was called Alternative Sportsperson of the Year.

Best Sporting Moment
The Best Sporting Moment Award, inaugurated in 2017, and voted for by the public, was won by the FC Barcelona under-12 (Infantil-B)  side for their sportsmanship in consoling a defeated opposition team.  The 2018 award was won by fans of the Iowa Hawkeyes football team, who at the end of the first quarter of each home game turn toward the children's hospital that overlooks the playing field and wave to patients watching the game.  For the 2020 ceremony, the Best Sporting Moment was drawn from the previous two decades and voted for by the general public.  Referred to as the "Laureus Sporting Moment Award (2000–2020)", it was won by Indian cricketer Sachin Tendulkar.  In 2021, Chris Nikic was presented with the Best Sporting Moment award.

Discretionary awards

Since 2000, the Laureus World Sports Awards have included a number of accolades given by the Academy at their discretion.  At the first ceremony in 2000, Brazilian footballer Pelé became the first recipient of the Lifetime Achievement Award, while American Eunice Kennedy Shriver, founder of the Special Olympics was presented with the inaugural Laureus Sport for Good Award.  The first Spirit of Sport award was presented in 2005 to the Boston Red Sox who had won the World Series for the first time in 86 years.  In 2013, American swimmer Michael Phelps became the first recipient of the Exceptional Achievement Award.  , Chinese tennis player Li Na (2015) and Italian footballer Francesco Totti (2018) are the only other people to be honoured with the award.  In 2017, the Refugee Olympic Team, comprising ten athletes from Syria, Congo, Ethiopia and South Sudan, was awarded the first Sporting Inspiration Award.  The following year, the award was presented to the American footballer J. J. Watt whose "exceptional humanitarian efforts" raised more than US$37 million for those impacted by Hurricane Harvey.  In 2021, Lewis Hamilton was presented with the Athlete Advocate of the Year Award.

Winners by year

Regular awards

Discretionary awards

See also
 Arthur Ashe Courage Award
 List of volunteer awards

References

External links

 
Sports trophies and awards
International awards
Awards established in 2000